Ipueiras may refer to the following places in Brazil:

 Ipueiras, Ceará
 Ipueiras, Tocantins